The Grand Prix de Plouay – Lorient Agglomération is an elite professional women's road bicycle race held in Plouay, France.

It is organized annually since 2002, on the day of the men's race and on the same circuit. The race consists of four 26,9 km laps and two 13,9 km lap, totalling 135,4 km.

The race was part of the UCI Women's Road World Cup until 2015. In 2016, the race became part of the new UCI Women's World Tour.

Route
The course is known for its high rate of attrition, with riders rapidly dropping out of contention. The first climb starts almost immediately as the race goes over the Côte du Lézot, a one-kilometre climb with an average gradient of 6%. Next is a six-kilometre ascent up to the Chapelle Sainte-Anne des Bois marking the halfway point of the lap. After a flat section, the race addresses the Côte de Ty Marrec, which has a maximum gradient of 10%. The riders will have to tackle this 26.9 kilometre loop 4 times, before entering a last shortened 13.9 kilometre version of the loop, taking the riders over the Côte du Lézot and the Côte de Ty Marrec. The run-in to the finish is slightly downhill. The race is often won by the best sprinter of the climbers.

Winners

Multiple winners

Wins per country

External links
 Official site

References

Recurring sporting events established in 2002
2002 establishments in France
Cycle races in France
UCI Women's Road World Cup
Women's road bicycle races
 
UCI Women's World Tour races